Karoline Herfurth (born 22 May 1984) is a German actress.

Life and career
Herfurth was born in East Berlin, East Germany, the daughter of a psychologist mother and a geriatric nurse practitioner father. Her parents divorced when she was two years old. She grew up in Berlin with a brother and five half-brothers and -sisters. She went to a Waldorf school in Berlin and graduated from Ernst Busch Academy of Dramatic Arts.
She learnt to play the recorder and studied sociology and political sciences.

Career

Herfurth had her first role in a TV series at age ten, and her first part in a movie in 2000, when she was fifteen. She has held several parts as a teenager in German movies such as Mädchen, Mädchen (2001) and Big Girls Don't Cry (2002) and leading parts both in TV productions and independent German films. For her part as Lilli Richter in Caroline Link's film A Year Ago in Winter, she received the Bavarian Film Award for best young actress in 2009.

Herfurth gave her international debut in 2006 in Perfume: The Story of a Murderer. In this adaptation of Patrick Süskind's best-selling novel Das Parfum, she played the "Plum Girl", the first victim of Jean-Baptiste Grenouille. In 2008, she co-starred with Kate Winslet and Ralph Fiennes in the Academy Award Best Picture-nominee The Reader.

She directed her first feature-length film SMS für Dich in 2016.

Personal life
Herfurth has spoken out opposing the right-wing Pegida movement in Germany.

Filmography

References

External links

 
 Karoline Herfurth at Hollywood.com

1984 births
Living people
Actresses from Berlin
Ernst Busch Academy of Dramatic Arts alumni
German child actresses
German film actresses
German television actresses
Waldorf school alumni
21st-century German actresses
20th-century German actresses
People from East Berlin
People from Pankow